Tito Peak is a prominent peak over 600 m, located at the end of the ridge 2 miles east of Mount Creak in the southeast extremity of Endeavour Massif, Kirkwood Range. In association with Endeavour Massif, named after Ramon Tito, Able Seaman on HMNZS Endeavour who raised the first NZ flag over Scott Base, January 20, 1957.

Mountains of Victoria Land
Scott Coast
Geography of the Ross Dependency